"Love All Over Me" is a song by American singer Monica. It was written by Crystal Johnson, Jermaine Dupri, and Bryan-Michael Cox for her sixth studio album Still Standing (2010), while production was helmed by Dupri, with Cox credited as co-producer of the song. Musically, "Love All Over Me" is a down-tempo R&B piece that rounds out Still Standing as another laid back, yet soulful track filled with admiration. The song was sent to rhythmic,  urban, and urban adult contemporary airplay as the album's second single in the United States on May 31, 2010. 

Critics received the song positively. In the United States, "Love All Over Me" peaked at number 58 on the Billboard Hot 100, also reaching number two on the Hot R&B/Hip-Hop Songs and the top of the Adult R&B Songs, becoming the album's second chart topper after lead single "Everything to Me" (2010). The song's accompanying music video, directed by Chris Robinson, features Monica pursuing her love interest in marriage.

Chart performance
The song debuted on the Billboard Hot 100 chart at number 94, and then peaked at number 58 on the Billboard Hot 100. The song charted at number two on the US R&B/Hip-Hop chart. The song also hit number one on the Urban Adult Contemporary Mediabase.

Music video
The Chris Robinson directed music video for "Love All Over Me" premiered on July 15, 2010 on 106 & Park. The plot of the video is Monica choosing between marrying her old love played by rapper Maino and her new love played by Shannon Brown. After the premiere of the video, fans could vote who Monica would pick as her love interest, resulting in the viewer's choice video being premiered July 23, 2010 on Vevo.

Charts

Weekly charts

Year-end charts

Release history

References

2009 songs
2010 singles
2010s ballads
contemporary R&B ballads
downtempo songs
J Records singles
Monica (singer) songs
music videos directed by Chris Robinson (director)
song recordings produced by Bryan-Michael Cox
song recordings produced by Jermaine Dupri
songs written by Bryan-Michael Cox
songs written by Crystal Nicole
songs written by Jermaine Dupri